Don Jaime de Mora y Aragón (19 July 1925 – 26 July 1995) was a Spanish aristocrat and actor. He appeared in more than thirty films from 1961 to 1995. He was also a brother of Queen Fabiola of Belgium.

Selected filmography

References

External links 

1925 births
1995 deaths
Spanish male film actors
20th-century Spanish nobility